Pakula or Pakuła is a surname. Notable people with the surname include:

 Alan J. Pakula (1928–1998), American film director
 Andrew Pakula (born 1957), American Unitarian minister
 Anna Pakuła-Sacharczuk (born 1956), Polish politician
 Irwin Pakula (1897–1988), American state senator for New York
 Martin Pakula (born 1969), Australian politician
 Ronald Pakula, a fictional character on the science fiction series The X-Files, who prior to season 11, was only known as Deep Throat (The X-Files).

See also
 Wilson Pakula, part of the election laws of New York
 

Slavic-language surnames